Perhat (Uighur: پەرھات) is a Uyghur masculine given name. Notable people with the name include:

Perhat Khaliq (born 1982), Chinese Uyghur pop-rock composer and musician
Perhat Tursun (born 1969), Uyghur writer and poet

Uyghur given names
Masculine given names